Stijn Stijnen (born 7 April 1981) is a Belgian retired professional footballer who played as a goalkeeper, and the current manager of Patro Eisden Maasmechelen.

He played in 189 Belgian Pro League games during thirteen seasons, mainly with Club Brugge with which he won nine major titles, including two national championships.

Club career
Born in Hasselt, Limburg, Stijnen moved from K.S.C. Hasselt to Club Brugge KV in 2000, aged 19, and became the club's first stand-in for veteran Dany Verlinden – when the latter retired at 41, he backed up Tomislav Butina. On 18 April 2003, he made his debut in the league, in a 3–0 away win against K.R.C. Genk. However, his big breakthrough came in the 2005–06 season, when he replaced the injured Butina several times; some strong performances (including the UEFA Champions League 2–1 home loss to Juventus in the group stage) made him the undisputed first-choice onwards.

In the 2006–07 campaign, Stijnen was between the posts as Brugge won the Belgian Cup 1–0 against Standard Liège, but the club only finished sixth in the domestic league. He never played in less than 31 league games in the following three seasons, but the Blue and Black did not manage to win any silverware.

Stijnen retired in the 2013 summer at the age of 32, after two top flight seasons with Beerschot AC. He returned to youth club Hasselt subsequently, after being appointed director of football.

International career
Belgium manager René Vandereycken noticed Stijnen's performances at club level, and handed him his debut in a friendly against Saudi Arabia on 11 May 2006. In March 2007, before an UEFA Euro 2008 qualifier in Portugal, he reportedly claimed his teammates should take opponent star Cristiano Ronaldo out of the game in an early stage, by all means necessary; eventually the home side won 4–0, with Cristiano Ronaldo scoring twice, and the Manchester United player accepted the Belgian's apologies.

Stijnen retired from international play in October 2009, after collecting 30 caps.

Career statistics

Honours
Club Brugge
Belgian First Division: 2002–03, 2004–05
Belgian Cup: 2001–02, 2006–07
Belgian Super Cup: 2002, 2003, 2004, 2005
Bruges Matins: 2000, 2001, 2004, 2006, 2007, 2008, 2009 
Jules Pappaert Cup: 2005

References

External links
Club Brugge profile 

1981 births
Living people
Sportspeople from Hasselt
Footballers from Limburg (Belgium)
Belgian footballers
Association football goalkeepers
Belgian Pro League players
Club Brugge KV players
Beerschot A.C. players
Belgium international footballers
Belgian football managers
K. Patro Eisden Maasmechelen managers